EA Sports PGA Tour (also marketed as EA Sports PGA Tour: Road to the Masters) is a sports video game developed by EA Tiburon and published by Electronic Arts for PlayStation 5, Windows and Xbox Series X/S. It is an entry in the EA Sports PGA Tour franchise, the first since 2015’s Rory McIlroy PGA Tour. It is also the first in the series not to bear an athlete’s name in the title since PGA Tour 98.

Gameplay
The game introduces several new features such as a new gameplay system called Pure Strike, which incorporates parts of a golf shot. It also features integration with ShotLink, the PGA Tour’s statistics tool as well as TrackMan. Playable tour players will include Cameron Champ, Tony Finau, Nelly Korda, Hideki Matsuyama, Xander Schauffele, Scottie Scheffler, Jordan Spieth, Im Sung-jae and Lexi Thompson.

Courses
The game will feature 30 courses at release, including Augusta National Golf Club for the first time since Tiger Woods PGA Tour 14.

Development
EA Sports PGA Tour was first announced in March 2021 Like its predecessor, the game runs on the Frostbite engine.

Release
Originally scheduled for an early 2022 release to coincide with the 2022 Masters Tournament, the game was delayed multiple times for undisclosed reasons. It is set to release on April 7, 2023, coinciding with that year’s Masters tournament (and being the same date as the second round), moved from the original date, March 24.

References

Upcoming video games scheduled for 2023
EA Sports games
Frostbite (game engine) games
Golf video games
Multiplayer and single-player video games
PlayStation 5 games
Video games based on real people
Video games developed in the United States
Video games set in Arizona
Video games set in Florida
Video games set in Massachusetts
Video games set in Scotland
Xbox Series X and Series S games